Luciano Pazzini Prado, known as Luciano Sorriso, (born 8 September 1983 in Guaratinguetá) is a Brazilian footballer. He currently plays for Santa Cruz.

Honours
Figueirense
Campeonato Catarinense: 2003, 2004, 2006

Santa Cruz
Campeonato Pernambucano: 2013
Campeonato Brasileiro Série C: 2013

Botafogo-SP
Campeonato Brasileiro Série D: 2015

References

External links
 Profile & Statistics at Guardian's Stats Centre
 CBF 

Living people
Brazilian footballers
1983 births
People from Guaratinguetá
Brazilian people of Italian descent
Campeonato Brasileiro Série A players
Campeonato Brasileiro Série B players
Campeonato Brasileiro Série C players
Figueirense FC players
Ipatinga Futebol Clube players
Mirassol Futebol Clube players
Associação Atlética Ponte Preta players
Clube Atlético Bragantino players
Fortaleza Esporte Clube players
Red Bull Brasil players
Santa Cruz Futebol Clube players
Atlético Clube Goianiense players
Botafogo Futebol Clube (SP) players
Association football midfielders
Footballers from São Paulo (state)